Sir Ralph Verney, 1st Baronet DL, JP (12 November 1613 – 24 September 1696) was an English baronet and politician who sat in the House of Commons at various times between 1640 and 1690.

Background
Baptised at Hillesden in Buckinghamshire, he was the eldest son of Sir Edmund Verney and his wife Margaret, eldest daughter of Sir Thomas Denton. He was the great grandson of Hon. Elizabeth Verney, second daughter of the first Baron Braye. Verney was educated at Magdalen Hall, Oxford and was called to the bar by the Middle Temple.

Career
Verney entered the Short Parliament in 1640, sitting as Member of Parliament for Aylesbury. He was re-elected MP for Aylesbury for the Long Parliament in November 1640. He was present in the trial of Thomas Wentworth, 1st Earl of Strafford in January 1641, making notes, and was knighted in March. Verney opposed William Laud before the Civil War, and sided with the Parliamentarians at its outset; however, when he did not partake in the Solemn League and Covenant in 1643, he was forced to flee into exile; three years thereafter his assets were confiscated. He went first to the Netherlands, met his wife in Blois in France, where she died, and arrived then in Italy.  He was disabled from sitting in Parliament on 22 September 1645.

Following his return to England in 1653, Verney was captured and imprisoned two years later, however released with a fine in 1656.

After the English Restoration in 1660, on advice of Anne Wilmot, Countess of Rochester, Verney stood for Great Bedwyn, but was unsuccessful. He was appointed a Commissioner of Oyer and Terminer for the Norfolk circuit in July and a Commissioner of Assessment in August, serving in Buckinghamshire. For the latter county Verney was a Justice of the Peace as well as a Deputy Lieutenant. On 16 March 1661, King Charles II of England made him a Baronet, of Middle Claydon, in the County of Buckingham. A year later, he became a Commissioner of Sewers in Bedfordshire and was additionally a commissioner for loyal and indigent officers in the same county.

In 1675, Verney was nominated a Commissioner of Recusants in Buckinghamshire. He was re-elected to the House in 1681 and represented Buckingham until 1690. During this time as Member of Parliament, he spoke against the coronation of William of Orange as king of England.

Family
On 31 May 1629, Verney married Mary Blacknall, daughter of John Blacknall in Hillesdon and had by her three sons and as many daughters. He died, aged 82 and was buried at Middle Claydon on 9 October 1696. His eldest son Edmund predeceased him and Verney was succeeded in the baronetcy by his second son John, who was later raised to the Peerage of Ireland as Viscount Fermanagh.

References

1613 births
1696 deaths
Alumni of Magdalen Hall, Oxford
Baronets in the Baronetage of England
Deputy Lieutenants of Buckinghamshire
Members of the Middle Temple
Ralph
English MPs 1640 (April)
English MPs 1640–1648
English MPs 1681
English MPs 1685–1687
English MPs 1689–1690